Adela Hernández is a Cuban politician. Elected to the municipal council of Caibarién in the Villa Clara Province in November 2012, she is the first transgender person ever elected to political office in Cuba.

She spent two years in prison in the 1980s, because her identity was in violation of the public decency laws in force at the time. She later worked as a hospital janitor, and later became a nurse and an electrocardiogram technician.

She was eligible for election to the National Assembly of People's Power in 2013.

References

Transgender politicians
Transgender women
Cuban LGBT politicians
Cuban transgender people
Living people
People from Caibarién
Janitors
1962 births
21st-century Cuban LGBT people
21st-century Cuban women politicians